Gyrodactylidea is an order of monogenean parasitic flatworms in the subclass Monopisthocotylea.

External links 

 
Platyhelminthes orders